Gleed may refer to:

Schools 
 Sir John Gleed School, former name of Spalding Academy, Lincolnshire, Spalding, Lincolnshire, England, which amalgamated in 2011:
 Gleed Girls' Technology College
 Gleed Boys' School

Other uses 
 Gleed (surname)
 Gleed, Washington, United States, a census-designated place
 Danuta Gleed Literary Award